The region of South East England is divided into 84 parliamentary constituencies, which are made up of 23 borough constituencies and 61 county constituencies. Since the general election of December 2019, 73 are represented by Conservative MPs, 8 by Labour MPs, 2 by Liberal Democrat MPs, and 1 by a Green MP.

Constituencies

Proposed boundary changes 
See 2023 Periodic Review of Westminster constituencies for further details.

Following the abandonment of the Sixth Periodic Review (the 2018 review), the Boundary Commission for England formally launched the 2023 Review on 5 January 2021. The Commission calculated that the number of seats to be allocated to the South East region will increase by 7 from 84 to 91. This includes the Isle of Wight which will have two protected seats, compared to one at present. Initial proposals were published on 8 June 2021 and, following two periods of public consultation, revised proposals were published on 8 November 2022. Final proposals will be published by 1 July 2023.

Under the revised proposals, the following constituencies for the region would come into effect at the next general election:

Results history 
Primary data source: House of Commons research briefing - General election results from 1918 to 2019

2019 
The number of votes cast for each political party who fielded candidates in constituencies comprising the South East region in the 2019 general election were as follows:

Percentage votes 

Key:

CON - Conservative Party, including National Liberal Party up to 1966

LAB - Labour Party

LIB - Liberal Party up to 1979; SDP-Liberal Alliance 1983 & 1987; Liberal Democrats from 1992

UKIP/Br - UK Independence Party 2010 to 2017 (included in Other up to 2005 and in 2019); Brexit Party in 2019

Green - Green Party of England and Wales (included in Other up to 2005)

Seats 

Key:

CON - Conservative Party, including National Liberal Party up to 1966 (2010-2017 - includes The Speaker, John Bercow)

LAB - Labour Party

LIB - Liberal Party up to 1979; SDP-Liberal Alliance 1983 & 1987; Liberal Democrats from 1992

OTH - 2010-2019 - Green Party

See also

 List of United Kingdom Parliament constituencies
 List of parliamentary constituencies in Berkshire
 List of parliamentary constituencies in Buckinghamshire
 List of parliamentary constituencies in East Sussex
 List of parliamentary constituencies in Hampshire
 Isle of Wight (UK Parliament constituency)
 List of parliamentary constituencies in Kent
 List of parliamentary constituencies in Oxfordshire
 List of parliamentary constituencies in Surrey
 List of parliamentary constituencies in West Sussex

Notes

External links 
Politics Resources (2017 Election results)

References